Phaedusa is a genus of terrestrial gastropods belonging to the subfamily Phaedusinae of the family Clausiliidae.

Species

 Phaedusa abletti Pham & Szekeres, 2014
 Phaedusa adrianae E. Gittenberger & Leda, 2019
 Phaedusa angkanensis Loosjes, 1950
 Phaedusa angustocostata Köhler & Burg Mayer, 2016
 Phaedusa bhutanensis H. Nordsieck, 1974
 Phaedusa bocki (Sykes, 1895)
 Phaedusa boettgeri H. Nordsieck, 2001
 Phaedusa borneensis (L. Pfeiffer, 1855)
 Phaedusa burmanica (Gude, 1914)
 Phaedusa ceylanica (Benson, 1863)
 Phaedusa chimiae E. Gittenberger & Sherub, 2019
 Phaedusa coccygea (Gredler, 1888)
 Phaedusa cochinchinensis (L. Pfeiffer, 1841)
 Phaedusa corticina (L. Pfeiffer, 1842)
 Phaedusa cumingiana (L. Pfeiffer, 1845)
 Phaedusa dichroa (Bavay & Dautzenberg, 1899)
 Phaedusa dorsoplicata Loosjes, 1953
 Phaedusa elisabethae (Möllendorff, 1881)
 Phaedusa eupleura (Bavay & Dautzenberg, 1899)
 Phaedusa filialis (E. Martens, 1903)
 Phaedusa filicostata (Stoliczka, 1873)
 Phaedusa hainanensis (Möllendorff, 1884)
 Phaedusa hamonvillei (Bavay & Dautzenberg, 1899)
 Phaedusa hayasii Kuroda, 1941
 Phaedusa hilberi (O. Boettger, 1884)
 Phaedusa inanis (Bavay & Dautzenberg, 1909)
 Phaedusa kazueae Hunyadi & Szekeres, 2021
 Phaedusa kelantanensis (Sykes, 1902)
 Phaedusa lemani (Gude, 1914)
 Phaedusa lucens Loosjes, 1953
 Phaedusa lypra (J. Mabille, 1887)
 Phaedusa matejkoi Grego & Szekeres, 2011
 Phaedusa micropaviei H. Nordsieck, 2011
 Phaedusa moluccensis (E. von Martens, 1864)
 Phaedusa pahangensis (Laidlaw, 1929)
 Phaedusa pallidocincta (Möllendorff, 1886)
 Phaedusa paviei (Morlet, 1893)
 Phaedusa percostata H. Nordsieck, 2016
 Phaedusa phongthoensis Loosjes & Loosjes-van Bemmel, 1949
 Phaedusa potanini (Möllendorff, 1902)
 Phaedusa pseudaculus H. Nordsieck, 2001
 Phaedusa pseudobensoni (Schmacker & O. Boettger, 1894)
 Phaedusa pygmaea Grego & Szekeres, 2011
 Phaedusa ramelauensis Köhler & Burg Mayer, 2016
 Phaedusa recondita (Sykes, 1894)
 Phaedusa sangayae E. Gittenberger & Leda, 2019
 Phaedusa shanica (O. Boettger, 1888)
 Phaedusa sorella H. Nordsieck, 2003
 Phaedusa stenothyra Möllendorff, 1901
 Phaedusa stenotrema Thompson & Dance, 1983
 Phaedusa subgranulosa H. Nordsieck, 2003
 Phaedusa szechuanensis Pilsbry, 1934
 Phaedusa theobaldi (W. T. Blanford, 1872)
 Phaedusa theristica (Mabille, 1887)
 Phaedusa timorensis H. Nordsieck, 2007

References

 Lindholm, W. A. (1924). A revised systematic list of the genera of the Clausiliidae, recent and fossil, with their subdivisions, synonymy, and types. Proceedings of the Malacological Society of London. 16 (1): 53‑64 
 Nordsieck, H. (2001). Revision of the system of the Phaedusinae from mainland China with the description of new taxa (Gastropoda: Stylommatophora: Clausiliidae). Archiv für Molluskenkunde, 129 (1/2): 25–63, 6 pls. Frankfurt am Main.
 Bank, R. A. (2017). Classification of the Recent terrestrial Gastropoda of the World. Last update: July 16, 2017

External links
 
 dams, H. & Adams, A. (1853-1858). The genera of Recent Mollusca; arranged according to their organization. London, van Voorst. Vol. 1: xl + 484 pp.; vol. 2: 661 pp.; vol. 3: 138 pls

Clausiliidae